Ground mantis is a common name given to various species of praying mantis believed to hunt on or near ground level rather than high amid foliage.  

Examples native to North America include:
Litaneutria minor — minor ground mantis 
Litaneutria skinneri — Skinner's ground mantis 
Yersiniops solitaria — horned ground mantis 
Yersiniops sophronica — Yersin's ground mantis

See also
List of mantis genera and species
Mantodea of North America
Dead leaf mantis
Flower mantis
Grass mantis
Leaf mantis
Shield mantis
Stick mantis

References

Mantodea
.
Insect common names